Ethmia heptasema is a moth in the family Depressariidae. It occurs in the rain forests of the coastal mountains of Australia from central Queensland to the Illawarra region of New South Wales and is possibly also present in New Guinea.

The wingspan is about  The forewings are grey with a satin sheen and a pattern of black dots.

The larvae possibly feed on Ehretia acuminata.

References

Moths described in 1898
heptasema